Lambton West was a federal electoral district represented in the House of Commons of Canada from 1883 to 1968. It was located in the province of Ontario. This riding was created from parts of Lambton riding.

The West Riding of the county of Lambton was initially defined to consist of the townships of Sarnia, Moore and Plympton, the town of Sarnia, and the villages of Wyoming, Forest and Point Edward.

History

In 1903, the riding was redefined to include the townships of Dawn and Sombra, and exclude the town of Forest.

In 1924, Lambton West was defined to consist of that part of the county of Lambton included in the townships of Plympton, Sarnia, Moore and Sombra (including Walpole Island, St. Anne's Island and the other islands at the mouth of River St. Clair), and the city of Sarnia.

In 1933, the townships of Bosanquet was added, and the township of Sombra was excluded. In 1947, the village of Arkona was added.

In 1952, the village of Grand Bend was added.

In 1966, the electoral district was abolished when it was redistributed between Middlesex and Sarnia ridings.

Members of Parliament

This riding elected the following members of the House of Commons of Canada:

Election results

|}

On Mr. Lister being appointed judge, 21 June 1898:

On Mr. Johnston's death, 4 July 1905:

 

On Mr. Goodison's death, 3 December 1928:

See also 

 List of Canadian federal electoral districts
 Past Canadian electoral districts

External links 
 Parliamentary website

Former federal electoral districts of Ontario